Rene Schwarz is a paralympic athlete from Austria competing mainly in category F54 throwing events.

Rene competed in the 2004 Summer Paralympics in the F54 javelin and shot put, winning a silver medal in the shot put.

References

External links
 

Year of birth missing (living people)
Living people
Paralympic athletes of Austria
Paralympic silver medalists for Austria
Paralympic medalists in athletics (track and field)
Athletes (track and field) at the 2004 Summer Paralympics
Medalists at the 2004 Summer Paralympics
Austrian male javelin throwers
Austrian male shot putters